Bela George Lugosi (born January 5, 1938) is an American attorney and the son of actor Béla Lugosi. His legal actions in Lugosi v. Universal Pictures led to the creation of the California Celebrities Rights Act. He is often referred to as Bela Lugosi Jr.

Biography
Lugosi attended the University of Southern California, where he received his B.S. in 1960 and LL.B. from its School of Law in 1964. He was admitted to the State Bar of California that year.
He practiced for much of his career at Hanna & Morton, a Los Angeles litigation boutique. For several years in the late 1990s and early 2000s, he was an executive at Comedy III Productions, the holding company founded by The Three Stooges.  He resigned from the Bar in 2018.  In 2022, he was inducted into the Rondo Hatton Classic Horror Awards' Monster Kid Hall of Fame.

Personal life
Lugosi met Nancy Beauchamp while students at Dorsey High School, marrying in 1957.  The marriage lasted 64 years until her January 2022 death.  He has four children, Greg, Jeff, Tim, and daughter Lynne Sparks, and seven grandchildren.

Lugosi has been among those who felt filmmaker Edward D. Wood Jr. exploited his father's stardom, taking advantage of the fading actor when he could not refuse any work. Most documents and interviews with other Wood associates in Nightmare of Ecstasy suggest that Wood and Lugosi were friends and that Wood helped Lugosi through the worst days of his depression and drug addiction.

See also
 Lists of lawsuits

References

External links

1938 births
Living people
20th-century American lawyers
American people of Hungarian descent
Lawyers from Los Angeles